Novye Khimki Stadium is football stadium in Khimki, Russia. It is the home ground of FC Khimki. The stadium holds 3,066 people. The football pitch was constructed in 1999, and the stands were built in 2006.

See also
Other stadiums in Khimki:
 Rodina Stadium
 Arena Khimki

External links
Novye Khimki at FC Khimki website

Football venues in Russia
Sport in Moscow Oblast
FC Khimki
Sports venues completed in 2006
Buildings and structures in Moscow Oblast
Khimki